Otto Münther (6 August 1864 Kuksema Parish, Järva County – 19 February 1929 Nõmmküla Parish, Järva County) was an Estonian writer, journalist and politician. He was a member of I Riigikogu. On 25 January 1921, he resigned his position and he was replaced by Paul Abramson.

References

1864 births
1929 deaths
Members of the Riigikogu, 1920–1923